was a Japanese swordsman who also served as a martial arts instructor of Tatsumi-ryū and Tokyo Metropolitan Police Department.

Biography 

Tatsumi-ryū is a Traditional Japanese martial arts.

In 1860, Henmi was given  which served as a license of the Tatsumi-ryū from his father. In the next year, Henmi obtained a permission from Sakura Domain to study in Edo. He studied in Shigakukan Dojo for 1 year, and was awarded a title of Shihan as soon as he returned to his hometown.

After the Meiji Restoration, Henmi worked as a tillager in Yachimata. In 1879, he was hired by the Tokyo Metropolitan Police Department as a martial arts instructor.　He established  there, and became the leading figure of martial arts at Tokyo Metropolitan Police Department.

See also 
 Tatsumi-ryū
 Kendo

References 
Shin-Jinbutsuoraisha (2002) "剣の達人111人データファイル"  
Shimizu, Noboru. Gakken Publishing. (2010) "幕末維新剣客列伝"  
Domoto, Akihiko. (2007) "高野佐三郎剣道遺稿集"

External links 
 Tatsumi-ryu Japanese Homepage 

1843 births
1894 deaths
Japanese swordfighters of the Edo period
Japanese police officers
People from Chiba Prefecture
Japanese kendoka
Japanese jujutsuka